Angel Stadium of Anaheim, better known simply as Angel Stadium, is a baseball stadium located in Anaheim, California. Since its opening  in 1966, it has served as the home ballpark of the Los Angeles Angels of Major League Baseball (MLB), and was also the home stadium to the Los Angeles Rams of the National Football League (NFL) from 1980 to 1994.

The stadium is often referred to by its unofficial nickname The Big A, coined by Herald Examiner Sports Editor, Bud Furillo. It is the fourth-oldest active ballpark in the majors, behind Fenway Park, Wrigley Field, and Dodger Stadium, and hosted the All-Star Game in 1967, 1989, and 2010.

ARTIC (Anaheim Regional Transportation Intermodal Center) servicing the Metrolink Orange County Line and Amtrak Pacific Surfliner, is located nearby on the other side of the State Route 57 and accessed through the Douglass Road gate at the northeast corner of the parking lot. The station provides convenient access to the stadium, the nearby Honda Center, and Disneyland from various communities along the route, which links San Luis Obispo, Los Angeles, and San Diego. The Anaheim Resort Transit stops at the center along with Orange County Transportation Authority buses.

Aside from professional baseball and football, Angel Stadium has hosted high school and college football games, the short-lived World Football League, two crusades by Evangelist Billy Graham, nearly 20 consecutive annual crusades by Evangelist Greg Laurie, Eid el Fitr celebrations, and concerts, and 2 to 3 AMA Supercross Championship races a year.

The stadium also houses the studios and offices of the Angels' owned and operated flagship radio station, KLAA (830 AM).

Location and "Big A"
Angel Stadium and its surrounding parking lot are roughly bounded by Katella Avenue to the north, the Orange Freeway to the east, Orangewood Avenue to the south, and State College Boulevard to the west.

The landmark "Big A" sign, which originally served as a scoreboard support in left field, is located near the eastern boundary of the parking lot. Broadcaster Victor Rojas would refer to the halo by saying "Light that baby up!" after a victory.

History

Beginnings

Angel Stadium has been the home of the Angels since their move from Los Angeles. On August 31, 1964, ground was broken for Anaheim Stadium and in 1966, the then-California Angels moved into their new home after having spent four seasons renting Dodger Stadium (referred to in Angels games as Chavez Ravine Stadium) from the Dodgers. (In their inaugural season of 1961, the Angels played their home games at Los Angeles' Wrigley Field.)

Consistent with many major-league sports stadiums built in the 1960s, it is located in a suburban area, though one that is host to major tourist attractions.

The field dimensions (333 feet instead of 347 or 350, for example) were derived from a scientific study conducted by the Angels. Based on the air density at normal game times (1:30 pm and 8 pm), the Angels tried to formulate dimensions that were fairly balanced between pitcher, hitter, and average weather conditions.

None of this seemed to matter to their Hall of Fame pitcher Nolan Ryan, who threw two of his record seven no-hitters in this ballpark, and racked up 2,416 of his 5,714 career strikeouts in eight seasons with the Angels (Ryan stats from The Sporting News Baseball Record Book). One of the no-hitters, on June 1, 1975, was his fourth, which tied Sandy Koufax's career record, one Ryan would eventually surpass with seven by the end of his career in 1993.

The Rams move in

In the late 1970s, Los Angeles Rams owner Carroll Rosenbloom was looking for a more modern venue than the Los Angeles Memorial Coliseum, and also wanted a stadium that would be small enough to keep Rams games from being blacked out on local television.  The Coliseum seated almost 100,000 people, and the Rams had trouble filling it even in their best years.  Rosenbloom brokered a deal by which the Rams would move from Los Angeles to an expanded Anaheim Stadium. To add more seats (eventually about 23,000) for football games, the mezzanine and upper decks were extended completely around the playing field, resulting in a roughly trapezoidal, completely enclosed stadium. An elevated bank of bleachers was built in right field, and temporary seats were placed underneath, to be pulled out for football games. Another bank of bleachers was built in left field. As a result, the view of the local mountains and State Highway 57 was lost.

Additionally, the Big A scoreboard support that stood in left field, and was the inspiration for the stadium's nickname, was moved  to its present site in the parking lot, adjoining the Orange Freeway beyond the right-field stands; its usage changed from scoreboard to electronic marquee advertising upcoming events at the stadium. A black and amber scoreboard/instant replay video board was installed above the newly constructed upper deck seats in left field. Swift technical innovations in scoreboards in the 1980s quickly made the 1979 display obsolete, and the visual quality was washed out during day games as it was in direct sunshine, thus in 1988, a Sony Jumbotron color board replaced it, with amber matrix displays installed about the right field upper deck and along the infield balcony. A triangular metal spire was added to the top of the Jumbotron to evoke the original emplacement of the "Big A".

As with the addition of football seats to Candlestick Park a decade before to accommodate the rival San Francisco 49ers, the changes would be to the disadvantage of the Angels, their fans, and the stadium atmosphere. However, as was the case nearly everywhere else where the multipurpose stadium concept was tried, most of the new center field seats were too far from the action. Also, while the expanded capacity allowed the Angels to set attendance records that still stand today, on most occasions even crowds of 40,000 left swaths of unusable and empty seats. It also didn't completely solve the television blackout issue which inspired the Rams to move from the Coliseum, as the stadium would not sell out if the Rams weren't competitive or the opposing team did not draw their own fans to Anaheim to sell out the game.

The expansion was completed in time for the 1980 NFL season, and the Rams played in Anaheim Stadium from then until their move to St. Louis after the 1994 season. The Rams would return to Los Angeles in 2016, playing their games at the Memorial Coliseum again for four seasons; the team moved into the new SoFi Stadium in Inglewood in 2020.

The January 17, 1994 Northridge earthquake on Martin Luther King Jr. Day caused the left-field Jumbotron to collapse onto the upper deck seats beneath it. As the Rams and Angels were both out of season and it occurred in the pre-dawn hours, nobody was injured. The damaged section was deconstructed and rebuilt with a new scoreboard structure and Jumbotron, eliminating the A-frame spire that evoked the Big A.

The Disney era

In 1996, The Walt Disney Company, a minority owner of the team since its inception (the stadium is located less than 3 miles (5 km) east of Disneyland and across from the Honda Center, the home venue of the then Disney-owned Mighty Ducks of Anaheim), gained enough support on the board to effectively take control of the team. Soon afterward, the Angels and the city of Anaheim agreed to a new deal that would keep the Angels in Anaheim until 2031, with an option to leave the facility after the 2016 season. As part of the deal, the stadium underwent an extensive renovation, returning the stadium to its original role as a baseball-only facility. Before the 1997 baseball season, the section behind the outfield wall was demolished. Disney briefly considered moving the Big A scoreboard to its original location, but decided against such a move, citing costs, as well as the fact that the Big A had become a Southern California landmark in its parking lot location.

Despite the fact that much of the stadium was still a hard-hat zone, the demolition and construction being only half-completed, the Angels played their 1997 season in Anaheim. Fans were greeted by a restored view of the San Gabriel and Santa Ana Mountains, the Brea Hills, and the 57 freeway beyond the outfield.

Work that didn't interfere with game play continued throughout the 1997 season, with major renovations resuming in the winter of 1997. These included the installation of outfield bleacher pavilions, a video display board and an out-of-town scoreboard below the right field seats. All of the multicolored seats were replaced by green seats. The exterior of the stadium was also renovated. The concrete structure and ramps were painted a combination of green and sandstone. Much of the façade of the stadium was torn down to create a more open feeling for visitors.

The most notable feature of the entire renovation, however, was a "California Spectacular" in which geysers erupt and a stream cascades down a mountainside (Pride Rock) covered with real trees, artificial rocks behind the left-center field fence, and new bullpens. Fireworks shoot out of the display at the start of games, after every Angel home run and after every Angel win (they had been shot off from a parking garage before then).

A plaza was built around the perimeter of the stadium, and inside are statues depicting longtime Angel owner and chairman Gene Autry and Michelle Carew, daughter of former Angel Rod Carew, who died of leukemia at the age of 18.

The main entrance includes two giant Angels hats complete with New Era tags on the sweatband (including one indicating the hats' size: 649½). The hats were originally blue and featured the Angels' "winged" logo designed by Disney for the 1997 season, and were repainted red and decorated with the present-day halo insignia for the 2002 season. Also outside home plate gate is a full-sized brick infield complete with regulation pitcher's mound and lighted bases, with bricks at each player position engraved with the names of Angels players who played at that position on Opening Day of each season since the Angels began play in 1961. For a fee, the green infield bricks can be engraved with fans' names or personalized messages.  The Angels opened their "new" stadium on April 1, 1998, with a 4–1 victory over the New York Yankees. The renovated stadium has 5,075 club seats and 78 luxury suites.

In 1998, the stadium was renamed Edison International Field of Anaheim after local utility Edison International reached a deal giving it naming rights over the stadium for 20 years, and during this time, the stadium was referred to as the "Big Ed". However, after the 2003 season, Edison International exercised its option to exit the sponsorship deal. On December 29, 2003, the Angels announced that from then on the stadium would be known as Angel Stadium (in full, Angel Stadium of Anaheim); Disney sold the Angels around this time as well.

Video improvements and cancelled sale
In 2009, Brookings, South Dakota-based Daktronics installed light emitting diode (LED) displays at the stadium. Two smaller displays flank the large display, and a field-level display sits in the centerfield fence.

The stadium will host baseball and softball at the 2028 Summer Olympics.

During the 2017-2018 offseason, the Angels upgraded the existing video boards in left and right field. The new left field video board measures , while the new right field board measures , the fourth largest scoreboard in MLB. In addition to this, the out of town scoreboard was upgraded, new video ribbons stretch from foul pole to foul pole, and a new sound system was added.

The Angels opted out of their lease in October 2018, largely to avoid a contractual provision which would have forced them to remain in the stadium until 2029, though the club then had no new stadium proposals or moving plans. In December 2019, the city of Anaheim agreed to sell the stadium and surrounding land to an Arte Moreno-affiliated management company for $325 million, with the team committed to remain in Anaheim until at least 2050, with options to remain until at least 2065. The deal, made behind closed doors, has led to allegations of corruption and violations of the state's Surplus Land Act. An ongoing FBI investigation into the city's internal affairs and the stadium sale eventually led to the resignation of Anaheim mayor Harry Sidhu on May 23, 2022, putting the stadium's pending sale into question. On May 24, 2022, the Anaheim City Council voted to cancel the sale to Moreno's SRB Management, in light of the corruption probe.

Seating capacity

Notable events

Baseball

The stadium was host to the 1967 MLB All-Star Game, the first All-Star Game to be played on prime-time television. This was the first time an All-Star Game was held at night since World War II. Angel Stadium again hosted All-Star Games in 1989 and 2010.

It hosted seven American League Division Series (2002, 2004, 2005, 2007, 2008, 2009, and 2014) and six American League Championship Series (1979, 1982, 1986, 2002, 2005, and 2009). Most notably, it hosted the 2002 World Series, which the Angels won in dramatic fashion over the San Francisco Giants, finally winning one for their late and long-time owner, "Singing Cowboy" Gene Autry (and for his widow and business partner Jackie, who is also honorary president of the American League).

Angel Stadium hosted several games during Round 2 of the 2006 World Baseball Classic.

Famous individual baseball milestones attained here include Mickey Mantle's last game-winning home run, Nolan Ryan's striking out of nine straight Boston Red Sox (and two of Nolan Ryan's seven no-hitters), Reggie Jackson's 500th career home run, Rod Carew's 3,000th career base hit, Don Sutton's 300th career win, Vladimir Guerrero's 400th career home run, George Brett's 3,000th career base hit, and Albert Pujols' 600th career home run.

On Saturday, August 9, 2014, the stadium hosted its longest game ever: a 6-hour, 31-minute contest between the Angels and the Boston Red Sox. Albert Pujols led off the batting in the bottom of the 19th inning with a walk-off homer, giving the Angels the win, 5–4.

The stadium is currently designated to host softball and baseball events for the 2028 Summer Olympics along with Dodger Stadium.

Football
A "Battle of the Bell" game between Fountain Valley High School and Edison High School was hosted here sometime during the 1970s.

Eric Dickerson broke the NFL single-season rushing record in game 15 of the 1984 season, finishing with 2,007 yards. (He would go on accumulate 2,105 yards that season.)

In December 2017, the Philadelphia Eagles used Angel Stadium as their practice field, as part of the Eagles’ two game west coast road trip.

Soccer
Anaheim Stadium hosted five group stage matches of the 1996 CONCACAF Gold Cup, including two involving the United States national team.

Concerts
Angel Stadium has played host to major recording acts in concert such as  The Rolling Stones, The Who, The Osmonds, Pink Floyd, Alice Cooper, The Grateful Dead, Madonna, Eagles, Jackson Browne, Linda Ronstadt, and Toots and the Maytals.

Motion picture set
Several major motion pictures have been shot at Angel Stadium. The final sequence of The Naked Gun: From the Files of Police Squad! (1988) features an electronically manipulated Reggie Jackson trying to shoot Queen Elizabeth II. Exteriors were shot at the ballpark, but most baseball scenes were shot at Dodger Stadium. The 1988 sci-fi comedy My Stepmother Is an Alien features a scene shot in Angel Stadium of Kim Basinger speaking to an extraterrestrial counsel. The 1990 comedy Taking Care of Business featured a World Series matchup between the Angels and the Chicago Cubs, with the baseball scenes in the movie having been filmed in the stadium.  The Disney remake of Angels in the Outfield (1994) prominently uses the ballpark; however, many of the interior shots were filmed at the Oakland–Alameda County Coliseum. The stadium served as a stand-in for Candlestick Park in filming of The Fan (1996). Scenes from Deuce Bigalow: Male Gigolo and Air Bud: Seventh Inning Fetch were also filmed here.

Other events
On November 16, 1979, Anaheim Stadium hosted Motorcycle speedway when it was the venue for the American Final, a qualifying round for the 1980 Speedway World Championship. Future dual World Champion Bruce Penhall won the Final from Scott Autrey and Dennis Sigalos. Penhall and Autrey qualified to the Intercontinental Final in England held over 6 months later. Penhall qualified through to his first World Final held at the Ullevi Stadium in Gothenburg, Sweden where he finished in 5th place.

Anaheim Stadium has hosted an AMA Supercross Championship round from 1976 to 1979, 1981 to 1987, 1989 to 1996, and 1999 to the present.

The stadium is also host to Monster Jam, which hosts several shows every year.

Angel Stadium has been the site of annual Christian Harvest Crusades since 1990. It has also hosted Muslim Eid el Fitr celebrations. In 2014, Barack Obama spoke at the commencement ceremony for the University of California, Irvine, which was held at the stadium to accommodate capacity and security concerns.

Regular season home attendance

Climate

References

External links

 
Angel Stadium at ballparksofbaseball.com
Ballpark Digest Visit to Angel Stadium
Angel Stadium's Major Renovations
MLB's Ballpark History

Sports venues completed in 1966
American football venues in California
Anaheim Angels stadiums
Baseball venues in California
Cal State Fullerton Titans baseball
Cal State Fullerton Titans football
California Angels stadiums
a
CONCACAF Gold Cup stadiums
Defunct college football venues
Defunct National Football League venues
Defunct soccer venues in the United States
Long Beach State Dirtbags baseball
Long Beach State 49ers football
Los Angeles Angels stadiums
Los Angeles Angels of Anaheim stadiums
Los Angeles Rams stadiums
Major League Baseball venues
Motorsport venues in California
National Football League venues in Los Angeles
North American Soccer League (1968–1984) stadiums
Rugby union stadiums in California
Soccer venues in California
Softball venues in California
Sports venues in Anaheim, California
Venues of the 2028 Summer Olympics
Venues of defunct NCAA bowl games
World Baseball Classic venues
World Football League venues
Olympic baseball venues
Olympic softball venues
1966 establishments in California
Populous (company) buildings